The 48th Daytime Emmy Awards, presented by the National Academy of Television Arts and Sciences (NATAS), honored the best in U.S. daytime television programming in 2020. It took place on June 25, 2021, as a remotely-produced special due to the COVID-19 pandemic.

Actress and television host Sheryl Underwood hosted the ceremony for the fifth consecutive time, though this was her first time hosting solo.

Ceremony information
The National Academy of Television Arts and Sciences (NATAS) announced in December 2020 that they plan to have the Daytime Emmy Awards remain virtually for a second consecutive year due to uncertainty over the COVID-19 pandemic. 

In April 2021, CBS signed a two-year deal to televise the Daytime Emmys, also allowing the ceremonies to be streamed on Paramount+ both in 2021 and 2022.

Winners and nominees

The standard nominations were announced on May 25, 2021. Winners in each category are listed first, in boldface.

Programming

Acting

Hosting

Directing/Writing

References

048
2021 in American television
2021 television awards
Impact of the COVID-19 pandemic on television
June 2021 events in the United States